Highland Falls, formerly named Buttermilk Falls, is a village in Orange County, New York, United States. The population was 3,684 at the 2020 census. The village was founded in 1906. It is part of the Poughkeepsie–Newburgh–Middletown, NY Metropolitan Statistical Area as well as the larger New York–Newark–Bridgeport, NY-NJ-CT-PA Combined Statistical Area.

Highland Falls is in the Town of Highlands and is adjacent to the United States Military Academy at West Point.

Geography

Demographics

As of the census of 2010, there were 3,900 people, 1,647 households, and 988 families residing in the village. The population density was 3,546.1 people per square mile (1,369.2/km2). There were 1,793 housing units at an average density of 1,630.3 per square mile (629.5/km2). The racial makeup of the village was 70.4% White, 13.0% African American, 2.3% Asian, 0.8% Native American or Alaskan Native, 9.1% from other races, and 4.4% from two or more races. 18.7% of the population were Hispanic or Latino of any race.

There were 1,647 households, out of which 29.5% had children under the age of 18 living with them, 40.9% were married couples living together, 14.1% had a female householder with no husband present, and 40.0% were non-families. 34.5% of all households were made up of individuals, and 10.9% had someone living alone who was 65 years of age or older. The average household size was 2.37 and the average family size was 3.07.

In the village, the population was spread out, with 22.1% under the age of 18, 8.2% from 18 to 24, 27.9% from 25 to 44, 28.6% from 45 to 64, and 13.2% who were 65 years of age or older. The median age was 40.2 years. For every 100 females, there were 97.1 males. For every 100 females age 18 and over, there were 92.9 males.

The estimated median income for a household in the village was $65,192, and the estimated median income for a family was $73,672. Males had an estimated median income of $47,069 versus $43,654 for females. The estimated per capita income for the village was $29,006. About 11.6% of families and 10.9% of the population were below the poverty line, including 14.0% of those under age 18 and 9.7% of those age 65 or over.

Education
Highland Falls is part of the Highland Falls-Fort Montgomery Central School District. The district has three campuses – Fort Montgomery Elementary School (Grades K-2), Highland Falls Intermediate School (Grades 3-8), and James I. O'Neill High School (Grades 9-12).

There was also a parochial school, Sacred Heart of Jesus School (of the Roman Catholic Archdiocese of New York), that served students in grades pre-kindergarten through eight. The school opened in 1930 and closed in 2011. The archdiocese suggested that parents send their children to St. Gregory Barbarigo School in Garnerville.

Ladycliff Academy existed in the Village of Highland Falls from 1900 to 1961. Ladycliff College existed on the same campus from 1933 to 1981. This campus was located on lands formerly known as Cranston's Hotel, and before that Cozzen's Hotel on the east side of the village overlooking the Hudson River.

Notable people
Television and film actor Charles Durning was a native of Highland Falls.
Musician Billy Joel lived in Highland Falls in the 1970s after he moved back to New York. New York at the time was struggling under civil disorder and economic stress. He wrote the song, "New York State of Mind", on a Greyhound Bus, en route to his home in Highland Falls. Joel lived in the Cragston neighborhood, which inspired him to write the song "Summer, Highland Falls".
Anne Morgan (1873-1952), philanthropist, daughter of banker J.P. Morgan
3 time All American Football player Dick (Richie) Scott was a 1942 graduate of Highland Falls HS.  Dick played (Center) at the U.S. Naval Academy and was selected first team in 1945, second team in 1946, and again to the first team in 1947.  He was Class president and Brigade Commander of Midshipmen.  He also earned Varsity Letters in Basketball and Lacrosse at NAVY.  He was Voted into the College Football Hall of Fame in 1987.  College Football Hall of Fame

References

External links

Village website
Highland Falls Public Library
Natives information Website

 
Villages in New York (state)
Villages in Orange County, New York
New York (state) populated places on the Hudson River
Populated places established in 1906
Poughkeepsie–Newburgh–Middletown metropolitan area
1906 establishments in New York (state)